The river Najerilla is a tributary of the river Ebro, Spain's most voluminous river.  The Najerilla rises in the province of Burgos and then flows through La Rioja.

Archaeology

The valley has been inhabited since prehistoric times. Two Iron Age hilltop settlements, Castillo Antiguo and Cerro Molino (near Hormilleja), have been excavated. They have been described as straddling "the interface between the Celtiberian heartland of central Iberia and the Atlantic zone of the Bay of Biscay".

Viticulture
La Rioja is one of Spain's main wine regions, and some of its vineyards are in the Najerilla valley.

References

External links

Rivers of Spain
Ebro basin
Rivers of Burgos
Rivers of Castile and León